Alessandro Numai (1440 – August 1485) was an Italian Roman Catholic prelate who served as Bishop of Forlì (1470–1485).

Biography
Alessandro Numai was born in 1440 in Forlì, Italy.
On 9 May 1470, he was appointed Bishop of Forlì by Pope Paul II.

He served as Bishop of Forlì until his death in Aug 1485.

References 

15th-century Italian Roman Catholic bishops
Bishops appointed by Pope Paul II
1440 births
1485 deaths
Bishops of Forlì